Secret Defense may refer to:

 Secret Defense (1998 film)
 Secret Defense (2008 film)